The Arabian Mau is a formal breed of domestic cat, originated from the early African wildcat, a short-haired landrace native to the Arabian Peninsula. It lives in the streets of the Arabian Peninsula and has adapted very well to its extreme climate. The Arabian Mau is recognized as a formal breed by few fancier and breeder organization and cat registry, World Cat Federation (WCF) and Emirates Feline Federation (EFF). Based on one landrace, the Arabian Mau is a natural breed.

It is medium in size, with a body structure that is rather large and firm, not particularly slender, and with well-developed musculature. The legs are comparatively long, with oval paws.

The head appears round but is slightly longer than broad. The nose is slightly concave curved when viewed in profile. The whisker pads are clearly pronounced, with a slight pinch. The chin is very firm. The eyes are slightly oval, large and slightly slanted. The cat may have any normal cat eye color. There is no relation between the eye and coat colors. Usually, Arabian Maus have bright green eyes. The ears are large, slightly forward and sideward-placed, a little long, and high-set on the skull.

While Arabian Maus are not technically hypoallergenic, its low propensity for shedding and dander production may cause lesser reactions in those with mild allergies.

History 
The breed has been a landrace native to the Arabian peninsula in countries such as Saudi Arabia, Kuwait, Qatar, Oman, and the United Arab Emirates for more than 1,000 years. Desert cats are well adapted to the hot environment of parts of Arabia.

Grooming 
Arabian Mau have short fur without an undercoat and as such, are not high shedders. They are very capable of keeping themselves neatly groomed. This makes grooming for the owner quite easy. While not always necessary, brushing will remove dead hairs and intensify the beautiful gloss of the coat.

Standard Arabian Mau
Females are medium-sized and elegant; however, males can be much larger and have muscular bodies. Their legs are long with perfectly oval paws. The tail has medium length with tapering toward the tip. The head appears to be round, but it is slightly longer than broad with well-defined whisker pads. Ears are large and well set. Their eyes are oval and match the coat color. The fur is short and has no undercoat, besides it lying close to the body. The coat should not be silky. The colors can be different but the most recognized are red, white, black, and brown tabby.

The Arabian Mau cat breed is a natural breed, so it must reflect the morphology and behavioral features of the cats living on the Arabian Peninsula. The standard has been drafted on the observation and the description of physical characteristics, which have been found in the cats of this area average population, originating from the Middle East and in its descendants. No prefixed model has been followed.

The Arabian Mau cats were approved by the WCF during the Annual General Meeting held on August 2–3, 2008 in Germany. The Arabian Mau cats have been able to participate in international shows since January 1, 2009.

See also 
 Egyptian Mau

References 

Arabian Peninsula
Cat breeds
Natural cat breeds
Mammals of the Arabian Peninsula